Allan John Melvin (February 18, 1923 – January 17, 2008) was an American actor and impressionist, who was cast in hundreds of television episodes from the 1950s to the early 1990s, often appearing in recurring roles on various series. Some of those roles and series include portraying various characters on The Andy Griffith Show, as real estate salesman Pete Dudley in My Favorite Martian, as Corporal Henshaw on The Phil Silvers Show, Sergeant Hacker on Gomer Pyle, USMC, Alice's boyfriend Sam the Butcher on The Brady Bunch, and as Archie Bunker's friend Barney Hefner on both All in the Family and Archie Bunker's Place. He has also voiced Tyrone the Bulldog, an arch-villain (with his aliases The Jester, The Puzzler, Poochquin, Sheriff of Sherwood and many others) in the live action/animated series The Secret Lives of Waldo Kitty and was Magilla Gorilla on The Magilla Gorilla Show.

Life and career
Melvin was born in Kansas City, Missouri, to Marie and Richard Melvin but lived part of his childhood in New York City with his paternal grandparents, Helen (née Campbell) and Frank Melvin.  Allan attended Columbia University, and after his graduation he served in the United States Navy during World War II. In 1944, he married Amalia Faustina Sestero in New York City.

While working at a job in the sound effects department of NBC Radio, he did a nightclub act and appeared and won on the Arthur Godfrey's Talent Scouts radio show. While appearing on Broadway in Stalag 17, he got his break into television by getting the role of Corporal Steve Henshaw on the popular The Phil Silvers Show program. "I think the camaraderie of all those guys made it such a pleasant way to work. They were so relaxed."

During this period, in addition to his role on The Phil Silvers Show, Melvin was often cast in slightly loud, occasionally abrasive, but generally friendly second banana roles. Melvin was also adept at "tough guy" roles; in an example of his range as an actor, one episode of The Phil Silvers Show featured Melvin doing a recognizable impersonation of Humphrey Bogart.

In the 1960s, Melvin worked extensively at CBS for Sheldon Leonard and Aaron Ruben. He played Staff Sgt. Charlie Hacker who was Sgt. Vince Carter's rival for four seasons on Gomer Pyle, USMC. He also made eight appearances on The Dick Van Dyke Show. He also provided the voices of cartoon character Magilla Gorilla, the lion Drooper on The Banana Splits Adventure Hour, archvillain Tyrone in The Secret Lives of Waldo Kitty and Bluto on The All New Popeye Hour. Melvin also made eight guest appearances on The Andy Griffith Show in eight different roles, usually as heavies. He also made three guest appearances on Perry Mason in various roles, including reporter Bert Kannon in the 1966 episode, "The Case of the Sausalito Sunrise." Also in 1966 Allan played the space enforcer on the series Lost in Space, in the episode "West Of Mars".

Melvin is remembered for supporting roles on two popular 1970s sitcoms. He played Sam Franklin, the owner of a local butcher shop and boyfriend of the Brady's housekeeper Alice (played by Ann B. Davis) on The Brady Bunch, and Barney Hefner, Archie Bunker's neighbor and friend on All in the Family.  In other contributions to 1970s pop culture, he appeared as a Mel's Diner patron on Alice and worked as a voice artist (under the name "Al Melvin"). He provided several characters’ voices for the TV show H.R. Pufnstuf and the voice of Prince Thun of the Lion Men on The New Adventures of Flash Gordon.  He also provided the voice of Rocky Maninoff for Tennessee Tuxedo in the episode "Mixed-up Mechanics" in 1963.

Some of his most prolific work was in television commercials, for products as diverse as Kellogg's Sugar Frosted Flakes and Remington electric razors. In the latter commercial, he sang a few bars of Frank Loesser’s song "I Believe in You" with a modified lyric. He was also featured as Al the Plumber on Liquid-Plumr drain opener commercials for fifteen years.

In the early 1980s, Melvin appeared as a regular in Archie Bunker's Place, in which he reprised the now more important role of Barney Hefner. After the series ended in 1983, Melvin's work was exclusively devoted to cartoon voice-overs. His voice acting career continued until 1994, with Scooby-Doo! in Arabian Nights being his final voice work (again as Magilla Gorilla) before retiring.

Death
Allan Melvin died of cancer on January 17, 2008, aged 84, and was buried at Westwood Memorial Cemetery, Los Angeles. Melvin is buried just yards from former TV co-star Carroll O'Connor.

Filmography

References

External links

 
 

1923 births
2008 deaths
Male actors from Kansas City, Missouri
American impressionists (entertainers)
United States Navy personnel of World War II
American male television actors
American male voice actors
Deaths from cancer in California
Columbia University alumni
Male actors from Greater Los Angeles
Male actors from New York City
Burials at Westwood Village Memorial Park Cemetery
20th-century American male actors
Hanna-Barbera people
Comedians from Missouri
Comedians from California
Comedians from New York City
20th-century American comedians